Mathias "Vreth" Lillmåns is the vocalist for the Finnish folk metal band Finntroll, and has been since 2006. He is also the vocalist and the bassist for the bands Chthonian and Twilight Moon. In 2009 he and fellow Finntroll member Samuli Ponsimaa formed the death metal band DecomposteR, in which he is the vocalist and bassist.

Discography

with Finntroll
Ur jordens djup (2007)
Nifelvind (2010)
Blodsvept (2013)
Vredesvävd (2020)

with Chthonian 

Of Beatings and the Silence in Between (2007)
The Preachings of Hate Are Lord (2010)

with The Iniquity Descent
The Human Apheresis (2012)

with ...And Oceans
Cosmic World Mother (2020)

with Alestorm
Curse of the Crystal Coconut (2020)

References

1982 births
Living people
Finnish heavy metal singers
Finntroll members
21st-century Finnish male singers
Swedish-language singers
Swedish-speaking Finns
People from Jakobstad